The Young Reader's Choice Award is an award program of the Pacific Northwest Library Association (PNLA) which was inaugurated in 1940 by Harry Hartman, a well-known Seattle based bookseller. It is the oldest "children's choice" award in the U.S. and Canada and the only award chosen by children in two countries. Initially a single award, in 1991 the award expanded to include both a Youth and Senior category. In 2002, a third award category, Intermediate, was created. The PNLA now offers three annual awards for books selected by schoolchildren in the Pacific Northwest. The PNLA homepage heading is "Alaska, Alberta, British Columbia, Idaho, Montana, Washington", a list of the four U.S. states and two Canadian provinces where most of its members are located. It is the oldest regional association and the only binational one in the US and Canada.

The three winners of 2018 awards were published during 2015. The voting, open to "anyone in grades four through twelve in the Pacific Northwest who has read (or has heard read) at least one title from the list", is conducted by member libraries during March and April (school and public libraries, primarily the former).

The nomination process was last revised in 2012. Children, teachers, parents and librarians in Pacific Northwest may recommend books to their state, provincial representatives or to the YRCA Chair. Nominations of 2017 publications are due in February 2018. One nominee in each category must also include either a Canadian author or a title where the story primarily occurs in Canada.

Recipients, 1940–1990

Recipients, 1991–2001

Recipients, 2002–present

Nominations 2019 - Present

References 

Citations
  YRCA [Young Reader's Choice Awards]. Pacific Northwest Library Association (PNLA.org). Retrieved 2014-04-29.
  YRCA [Young Reader's Choice Awards]. Pacific Northwest Library Association (PNLA.org). Retrieved 2018-05-18.

External links 

 National and State Awards at Washington Library Media Association – including Washington state's own Elementary (K–6) awards

American children's literary awards
Canadian children's literary awards
Awards established in 1940
Culture of the Pacific Northwest